Scott Hunter-Russell (born 1 June 1970) is an Australian archer. He competed at the 1992 Summer Olympics and the 2000 Summer Olympics.

References

External links
 

1970 births
Living people
Australian male archers
Olympic archers of Australia
Archers at the 1992 Summer Olympics
Archers at the 2000 Summer Olympics
Sportspeople from Sydney